The Argentine (Spatalia argentina) is a moth of the family Notodontidae. It is found in Central and Southern Europe, through Turkey and Iraq, up to Iran.

The moth flies from April to August in two generations depending on the location.

The larvae mainly feed on Quercus species, but also on Salix and Populus species.

References

External links

Moths and Butterflies of Europe and North Africa
Lot Moths and Butterflies
Lepiforum.de

Notodontidae
Moths of Europe
Moths of Asia
Taxa named by Michael Denis
Taxa named by Ignaz Schiffermüller
Moths described in 1775